Guy Montgomery is a comedian from New Zealand. He was the winner of the Billy T award in 2014.

Early life
Montgomery was born and raised in Christchurch, New Zealand. He then went on to study at Victoria University of Wellington.

Television
Montgomery's first appearance in TV was on the TVNZ U channel that launched in 2013. He there hosted the show U LATE, where he first met his podcast partner Tim Batt. From U LATE, Montgomery moved into writing for several different comedy shows in New Zealand, such as Jono and Ben at 10.

Montgomery's television work includes being a writer and presenter of his magnum opus, Fail Army.

Montgomery appeared on the May the 4th, 2020 fundraiser episode of The George Lucas Talk Shows, The George Lucas Talk Show All Day Star Wars Movie Watch Along.

In 2021, Montgomery took part in series two of Taskmaster NZ and appeared on the panel show Patriot Brains.

Montgomery was a contestant on the 2022 series of the New Zealand reality television show Celebrity Treasure Island, and was the first player to be eliminated.

In 2023, Montgomery's television show Guy Montgomery's Guy Mont-Spelling Bee premiered.

Podcasts
The Worst Idea Of All Time podcast was started in 2014 by Montgomery and Tim Batt. The podcast follows them as they report upon the viewing experience of the same movie each week for a year. The first season was focused on the Adam Sandler movie Grown Ups 2; the second on Sex and the City 2; and the third season focused on We Are Your Friends. Montgomery and Batt are also the co-hosts of a once-yearly, eternal Paul Blart: Mall Cop 2 review podcasts that will air every American Thanksgiving until all five original hosts die, 'Til Death Do Us Blart. On the 2018 episode of Til Death Do Us Blart, Guy and Tim announced the fourth season of The Worst Idea of All Time, which focused on the first Sex and the City film, and was released through 2019. After the onset of the COVID-19 pandemic, the duo did an "emergency season," in which they watched the film Home Alone 3 every three days until their local New Zealand lockdown orders were lifted. As of the end of September, 2020, Montgomery and Batt have undertaken the fifth season, and instead of rewatching the same movie every week they are watching a different movie from the same film series. The series they are drawing from for the fifth season is the French/American Emmanuelle series of softcore pornography.

Montgomery also created a short podcasts series, Hosting, with fellow comedian Carlo Ritchie exploring the cultural differences of Australians and New Zealanders as Ritchie spends a week in the "land of the long white cloud" with Montgomery.

References

Living people
New Zealand comedians
1988 births
New Zealand podcasters
Participants in New Zealand reality television series
Contestants on New Zealand game shows